Alexander Alexandrovich Kirikov (born 21 October 1980 in Moscow, USSR) is a Russian curler.

At the international level he is a 2006 European Mixed Curling Championship bronze medallist.

At the national level he is a four-time Russian men's champion curler (2005, 2006, 2008, 2010) and a four-time Russian mixed champion curler (2007, 2008, 2009, 2010).

He is Master of Sports of Russia, International Class (curling).

Teams

Men's

Mixed

Mixed doubles

References

External links

Living people
1980 births
Curlers from Moscow
Russian male curlers
Russian curling champions